Landshövdingehus is a building type unique to the Swedish city of Gothenburg.  19th century city bylaws ruled that houses made of wood could be of maximum of two storeys high, in order to protect against fires. However, one building association tried to circumvent the rule and submitted drawings for a building with the ground storey built of brick and two upper storeys of wood. The city building council did not accept the application, but the county government overruled them and the landshövdingehus—"governor house"—was born.

The very first building of this kind was built 1875 in the city district of Annedal. It was demolished in the redevelopment of the 1970s, but many other examples of these buildings remain today.

Characteristics 
A characteristic of all landshövdingehus is the combination of one brick and two wooden storeys. Most landshövdingehus were built for the working class. The apartments generally had a kitchen and one living room. Up to fifteen people could live in one apartment of this kind, due to the extreme shortage of housing at the time. The apartments usually provide a floorplan with light from two directions: a window in the kitchen orientated towards an inner courtyard, and a window in the living room facing the street.

Independent builders constructed the buildings, sometimes using architect drawings. Different owners could separate a courtyard into parcels divided by fences. Nowadays most of the area of Majorna and Kungsladugård is owned by a single entity (Familjebostäder, a municipal housing company), but in some courtyards this separation can still be seen. In Kungsladugård, the city plan by Albert Lilienberg and the original variation in ownership have given a building structure that balances variation and context in a very elegant way.

Variety in style 
Because of the comparatively long building period (1875–1950) of the ”landshövdingehus”, they show an interesting variation in style. The districts Majorna and Kungsladugård in western Gothenburg were saved from the demolition in the 1960s due to protest actions. Here you can find a large, contiguous area of houses and explore styles from an almost complete representation of the period, except from the very earliest period of building. In Lunden, the central-eastern part of Gothenburg there is also an area of renovated blocks of Landshövdingahus from the period 1920–1935 who have retained their original style.

The first landshövdingehus in Annedal, built 1875, and others built in the period between 1875–1880 had a strictly classical style with limited decoration.

The landshövdingehus built around 1880–1890 attempted to imitate the more high-status stone houses. They used horizontal board panelling and rich profiling. Often they were decorated with bay or dormer windows, corner towers and/or rustication of the brick wall.

During the art nouveau or jugend period of the 1920s, the colour of the houses changed to darker – often reddish brown – nuances. The façades were more elaborately detailed with balconies and portals.

The functionalist period of the 1930s also influenced the style of the landshövdingehus. The façades were cleansed of decoration and the wooden panelling was nailed vertically. Usually the brick ground floor was plastered smooth.

The 1940s saw the end of the landshövdingehus saga with a new decree from the authorities: new landshövdingehus were forbidden as a fire precaution in case of war.

Locations 
There are landshövdingehus in the following districts of Gothenburg:

 Almedal
 Annedal
 Bagaregården
 Brämaregården
 Färjestaden
 Gamlestaden
 Gårda
 Haga
 Krokslätt
 Kungsladugård
 Kyrkbyn
 Kålltorp
 Landala
 Lindholmen
 Lunden
 Majorna
 Olivedal
 Olskroken
 Rambergsstaden
 Redbergslid
 Sannegården
 Stigberget
 Vasastaden

References

Further reading 
Larsson, Ursula (1979) Landshövdingehusens Göteborg. Stockholm: LiberFörlag 
Ligoura, Anna & Molander, Lisa (2001) Inredning av vindar i landshövdingehus: exempel från Majorna. Göteborg: Göteborgs stadsbyggnadskontor 
Nordberg, Bernt (1961) Göteborgs Historiska museum – Årstryck 1961; "Landshövdingehusen – ett stycke Göteborgsk byggnadshistoria". Göteborg: Göteborgs Historiska Museum 

Gothenburg
Buildings and structures in Gothenburg
Architectural styles
Housing in Sweden